Manuela Delilaj (born 9 May 1966) is an Albanian sports shooter. She competed in the women's 10 metre air pistol event, and Women's 50 m freestyle event, at the 2020 Summer Olympics.

She competed at the 2018 European Championships, 2019 European Championships, and 2020 European Championships.

References

External links
 

1966 births
Living people
Albanian female sport shooters
Olympic shooters of Albania
Shooters at the 2020 Summer Olympics
Place of birth missing (living people)
European Games competitors for Albania
Shooters at the 2019 European Games